Carter Ashton (born April 1, 1991) is a Canadian professional ice hockey player currently playing for Leksands IF of the Swedish Hockey League (SHL). Ashton was drafted 29th overall by the Tampa Bay Lightning in the 2009 NHL Entry Draft. He was born in Winnipeg, Manitoba, but grew up in Saskatoon, Saskatchewan.

Playing career

Junior
Ashton was drafted by the Lethbridge Hurricanes of the Western Hockey League (WHL) in the first round, seventh overall, in the 2006 WHL Bantam Draft. He appeared in two games with the Hurricanes in the 2006–07 season, earning no points. Ashton's rookie season in the WHL was in 2007–08. He played only 40 games, missing significant time due to injury. During the WHL playoffs that season, Ashton helped the Hurricanes reach the finals of the WHL playoffs.

Ashton had a breakout season in 2008–09, appearing in 70 games with the Hurricanes and scoring a team-high 30 goals while adding 20 assists for 50 points, which was the fourth-highest total on the club. In the post-season, Ashton appeared in 11 games, earning three points. During the 2008–09 season, Ashton played for Team Cherry in the CHL Top Prospects Game. After the season, Ashton was selected 29th overall by the Tampa Bay Lightning in the 2009 NHL Entry Draft. He attended training camp with the Lightning and the team signed him to an entry-level contract on October 2, 2009.

Ashton began the 2009–10 season with the Hurricanes, and after recording 13 goals and 26 points in 28 games, the Hurricanes traded him to the Regina Pats. With Regina, Ashton had 11 goals and 25 points in 37 games, as the Pats failed to qualify for the playoffs. On December 10, 2010, Ashton was traded to the Tri-City Americans.

Professional
In the 2011–12 season, on February 27, 2012, Ashton was traded from the Tampa Bay Lightning to the Toronto Maple Leafs in exchange for defenceman Keith Aulie. Ten days later, on March 7, 2012, Ashton made his debut with the Maple Leafs and played in his first NHL game in a 3–2 loss to the Pittsburgh Penguins. He played 15 games with the Leafs in his first season and 32 games in the 2013–14 season registering 3 points. He also played 24 games registering 23 points with the Leafs' American Hockey League affiliate Toronto Marlies. He was re-signed to a one-year two-way contract worth $850,000 in July 2014.

On November 6, 2014, Ashton was suspended for 20 games, without pay, for violating the terms of the NHL/NHLPA Performance Enhancing Substances Program. Ashton claimed to have unknowingly ingested a banned substance while using an un-prescribed inhaler for exercise-induced asthma. The suspension came with a mandatory referral to the NHL/NHLPA Program for Substance Abuse and Behavioral Health for evaluation and possible treatment. At the time, he had played in three games for the Leafs and did not register a point. He had also played in 24 games for the Marlies and accumulated 23 points. On February 6, 2015, Ashton was traded from the Maple Leafs back to Tampa Bay in a deal that included David Broll and a conditional seventh-round draft pick in 2016 entry draft from the Lightning. 

On July 21, 2015, Ashton signed as a restricted free agent from the Lightning, with the Russian club Torpedo Nizhny Novgorod of the Kontinental Hockey League (KHL). After two seasons with Torpedo and having established himself in the KHL, Ashton moved to fellow KHL club, HC Lada Togliatti, in a trade for the final year of his contract on June 2, 2017. At the completion of the 2017–18 season, Ashton left Lada as a free agent, signing a two-year contract with his third KHL club, Severstal Cherepovets on June 15, 2018.

International play

Ashton played for Team Saskatchewan at the 2007 Canada Winter Games which were held in Whitehorse, Yukon. He also played for Team West at the 2007 World U-17 Hockey Challenge, where he served as an alternate captain on the team that won the bronze medal.

After his rookie season in the WHL, Ashton played for Team Canada at the 2008 Ivan Hlinka Memorial Tournament, helping the team to a gold medal. Ashton finished the tournament with one goal and two assists in four games, including a goal in the gold medal win against Russia.

He was later invited to take part in Canada's 2011 national junior team selection camp  Carter played for Team Canada at the 2011 World Junior Ice Hockey Championships held in Buffalo, New York. He finished with one goal and two assists as Canada won the silver medal.

Personal life
Ashton's father, Brent, played in 998 NHL games in a career that spanned from 1979 to 1993. His father held the record for the most traded player in NHL history until the record was tied by Mike Sillinger. Carter was born in Winnipeg during his father's stint with the Jets.

Carter is close friends with Luke and Brayden Schenn, Jared Cowen and Jimmy Bubnick from their minor hockey days in Saskatoon.

Career statistics

Regular season and playoffs

International

Awards and honours

References

External links

1991 births
Living people
Canadian expatriate ice hockey players in Russia
Canadian expatriate ice hockey players in the United States
Canadian ice hockey right wingers
Dinamo Riga players
Ice hockey people from Saskatchewan
HC Lada Togliatti players
Leksands IF players
Lethbridge Hurricanes players
National Hockey League first-round draft picks
Norfolk Admirals players
Regina Pats players
Severstal Cherepovets players
Sportspeople from Saskatoon
Ice hockey people from Winnipeg
Syracuse Crunch players
Tampa Bay Lightning draft picks
Toronto Maple Leafs players
Toronto Marlies players
Torpedo Nizhny Novgorod players
Tri-City Americans players
Canadian expatriate ice hockey players in Latvia
Canadian expatriate ice hockey players in Sweden